The Grass Harp is a 1995 American comedy-drama film based on the novella by Truman Capote; the screenplay was the final work of Oscar-winning screenwriter Stirling Silliphant. The film was directed by Charles Matthau, and starred Piper Laurie, Sissy Spacek, the director's father Walter Matthau, Jack Lemmon, Edward Furlong, and Nell Carter. Piper Laurie won the Best Supporting Actress award from the Southeastern Film Critics Association for her work on the film.

Plot
Set in a small 1940s Alabama town, the film follows Collin Fenwick (Edward Furlong) as he is sent to live with his father's maiden cousins, the sweet Dolly (Piper Laurie) and the overbearing Verena (Sissy Spacek), following the death of his mother. He soon discovers that the Talbo household is anything but normal. After also losing his father, Collin grows to be close to Dolly and maid Catherine (Nell Carter), and becomes acquainted with the eccentric townspeople, from the gossip-loving barber (Roddy McDowall) to a traveling evangelist with 15 illegitimate offspring (Mary Steenburgen). To escape Verena's oppression, Dolly, Collin, and Catherine run away to an old tree house in the woods. Their rebellion sparks a series of events that changes their lives and the entire town, as well.

Cast
Piper Laurie as Dolly Talbo is a gentle eccentric, Verena's sister
Sissy Spacek as Verena Talbo is a controlling entrepreneur with most of the town in her pocket, and Dolly's sister
Edward Furlong as Collin Fenwick is an orphan sent to live with Dolly and Verena
Nell Carter as Catherine Creek is a quick-witted house maid and Dolly's friend
Walter Matthau as Judge Charlie Cool is a former judge attempting to find meaning in his retirement years and Dolly's love interest
Roddy McDowall as Amos Legrand is the effeminate town barber and gossip
Jack Lemmon as Dr. Morris Ritz is a confidence man who charms Verena
Mary Steenburgen as Sister Ida is a good-hearted traveling "evangelist"
Sean Patrick Flanery as Riley Henderson is Collin's friend and eventual competitor for the affections of Maude
Joe Don Baker as Junius Candle is the town sheriff
Scott Wilson as Eugene Fenwick is Colin's father, who leaves him with Dolly and Verena after the death of his wife
Mia Kirshner as Maude Riordan is Collin's "love interest"
Charles Durning as Reverend Buster
Bonnie Bartlett as Mrs. Buster
Doris Roberts as Mrs. Richards
Ray McKinnon as Charlie Cool, Jr.

Development and production
The Grass Harp feature film was based on Truman Capote's 1951 semi-autobiographical novel of the same name. The screenplay was written by Stirling Silliphant and Kirk Ellis. Silliphant's previous credits include In the Heat of the Night, The Towering Inferno, and The Poseidon Adventure. The film was directed by Charles Matthau, son of Walter Matthau. It was filmed on location in Wetumpka, Alabama.

Reception
The New York Times review of the film stated that the actors' performances were "uniformly expert, sharp renderings of distinctive individuals" and that Charles Matthau had "managed to set them in a landscape specifically distant and atmospheric". The Los Angeles Times review called it a beguiling film and one that "celebrates rebirth and renewal but within a tough-minded view of life that never allows it to lapse into a fairy tale". Variety called it a "sensitive screenplay adaptation" and noted the film's "wonderful ensemble cast". Despite generally good reviews, the film did poorly at the box office. With an estimated budget of $9 million, the film grossed only roughly $1.5 million in ticket sales.

References

External links
Official website
New York Times review of The Grass Harp
 
 
 

1995 films
Films shot in Alabama
Films set in Alabama
American comedy-drama films
1995 comedy-drama films
Davis Entertainment films
Films scored by Patrick Williams
Films set in the 1940s
Films based on American novels
Films based on works by Truman Capote
Films produced by John Davis
1990s English-language films
Films directed by Charles Matthau
1990s American films